Vital Health Foods is the largest vitamin and nutritional supplement company in Africa, with its head office in Cape Town. The manufacturer adheres to medicinal Good Manufacturing Processes. It is audited by the Medicines Control Council in South Africa and by Therapeutic Goods Administration internationally.

History

Vital Health Foods was the first health foods company in South Africa, founded in 1947 by Mr. Jack Grieve in the small town of Wellington, South Africa. The company has grown to be the leading supplement manufacturer in Africa, exporting internationally. The company formulates, tests, and manufactures its own products, and provides a customer helpline run by qualified dieticians.

References

External links
Company website

Health food stores
Manufacturing companies based in Cape Town
Food and drink companies based in Cape Town